Daniel Widdowson, is an Australian radio, theatre, television and film actor, artistic director and writer, who was an Australian of the Year finalist at age 19 for contributions to the arts, finalist in the Young Australian Playwright's awards, and recipient of the Collins Bookseller's Arts award. He hosted and wrote for popular children's show Saturday Disney in 2000, a gig that lasted seven years. In that time he also played the handyman sidekick on Ground Force and wrote scripts for Home & Away. Moving into radio in 2007, he formed half the team of Hope Breakfast on Hope 103.2. Having penned several documentaries, children's dramas, and stage plays, Daniel became a member of the Australian Writer's Guild. In 2016 he and his wife Leia established Salt House Theatre Company on the Central Coast, NSW. Due to the success of Daniel's stage adaptation of Pride & Prejudice he was invited to become an ambassador for the Jane Austen Literacy Foundation.

Current day
Daniel currently works as the artistic director for Salt House Theatre Company, whilst producing and performing other in works in television, film, radio, and theatre.

TV career
Dan is best known as Disney Dan, former host of Saturday Disney kids program from 2000 to 2007.  He has worked on Home & Away, Ground Force, The Big Arvo, The One, Sunrise, and has made several guest appearances.

Radio career
Dan's radio career started at Hope 103.2 Sydney formerly 2CBA. With his exposure on Disney Dan, Aaron Wright from the breakfast team invited Dan to join the station as co-host at the suggestion of Stephen "Supertech" Wilkinson. His foray into radio began in 2007 as half of the comedy breakfast team Aaron and Dan on Sydney Radio Station Hope 103.2 with Aaron Wright. When asked how he broke into Radio Dan responded, 'Aaron asked me.' He presented and produced local radio on Norfolk Island for three years from 2011 to 2013. During this time he also ran the island's television station, TVNI

Film
Primarily a presenter, Daniel has also guest starred in various films including the American film Suing the Devil. And in 2018's feature Xavier's Harvest.

Writer
Dan was one of the writers for the TV Series Home and Away.

Early 2010 Dan finished an illicit drug edu-doco in partnership with the Centre for Customs and Excise Studies at the University of Canberra, explaining the origins of major drugs and the effects they have on the human body.

Late 2010 he underwent a 6-month method acting assignment with a professional body builder for a body builder doco, spending 6 months in the life of a body builder, eating measured amounts six times a day, consuming protein content, working out six days a week, the same routine as a professional body builder.

Film/TV

Writer/awards

References

Living people
Australian television presenters
Year of birth missing (living people)